During the 1997–98 English football season, Grimsby Town F.C. competed in the Football League Second Division.

Season summary
The 1997–98 season saw the return of Alan Buckley as manager, after an unsuccessful period at West Bromwich Albion, for Grimsby's most successful post-war season. In the summer of 1997, Buckley succeeded in bringing in players to the club who were to be instrumental in the club's upcoming season. Former skipper Paul Groves was re-signed from West Bromwich Albion, and Kevin Donovan and David Smith also joined the club from Albion. The mid-season capture of Huddersfield Town midfielder Wayne Burnett proved to be a great bit of business for Buckley. After a seemingly poor start to the League campaign, performances improved, which propelled the club into a promotion battle with Watford, Bristol City and an expensively assembled Fulham (at the time the only club at this level to have spent seven-figure sums on players). A good run in the League Cup saw The Mariners knock holders Leicester City and fellow Premier League side Sheffield Wednesday out of the competition before finally losing out to Liverpool. A decent run of form had ignited the careers of such younger players as Daryl Clare, Danny Butterfield and Jack Lester who were becoming an integral part of the Blundell Park set-up. The Mariners went on to dump Burnley out of the Football League Trophy Northern section area final, which would see the club book its first trip to Wembley Stadium. The club were drawn against Southern section champions AFC Bournemouth and in a tight game, an equaliser from substitute Kingsley Black took the game into extra time, and in the 112th minute Grimsby secured the game courtesy of a golden goal from Wayne Burnett. This was the first major trophy awarded to the club following its first appearance at Wembley. It took only four weeks for Grimsby to return to the stadium though, this time to face Northampton Town in the Division Two Play Off Final. Town won the game 1–0 thanks to a first half Kevin Donovan goal which gave the club a historic Wembley double and The Mariners promotion back to Division One.

Transfers

Transfers In

Loans In

Transfers Out

Loans Out

Transfers in:  £1,020,000
Transfers out:  £2,200,000
Total spending:  £480,000

Final league table

Results
Grimsby Town's score comes first

Legend

Football League Second Division

Second Division play-offs

FA Cup

League Cup

Football League Trophy

Squad

References

Grimsby Town F.C. seasons
Grimsby Town